is a Japanese four-panel manga written and illustrated by Toshiya Wakabayashi. It was serialized in Kodansha's Bessatsu Shōnen Magazine from August 2014 to March 2015, and transferred to Weekly Shōnen Magazine, where it ran from April 2015 to July 2018. It was compiled into twelve tankōbon volumes.

An anime adaptation by Studio Gokumi aired from July to September 2017.

Plot
Tsuredure Children tells various romantic stories about how it is hard to say "I love you", between young students attending the same high school, in an omnibus format. The characters in each story are connected to each other through their various friendships.

Characters

Second year

Class 2-1, Haruhiko is a soccer club member alongside Sugawara. He is interested in his classmate Saki Kanda and waits for her to actually confess her feelings.

Class 2-1, Saki is a member of the soft tennis club. She is in love with Haruhiko Takase and makes repeated unsuccessful attempts to confess. She is good friends with Yuki Minagawa and seeks advice from her.

Class 2-1, Jun is the straightlaced member of the broadcasting club. He is regularly confessed to by his classmate Yuki Minagawa, but due to her easygoing personality, he is never able to tell whether Yuki is serious. Jun eventually returns her feelings and they become a couple.

Class 2-1, Yuki is a member of the soft tennis club. She is the class representative, but often delegates her tasks to Jun Furuya to slack off and spend time with him. A girl with a lot of friends with the impression of being a playgirl, Yuki consistently confesses to Jun, using various riddles to express her affections in the hopes he'll reciprocate. Jun eventually returns her feelings and they become a couple.

Class 2-4, Takurō is a member of the soccer club who is nicknamed "Sugayan". He has long been in love with his classmate Chizuru Takano due to her helpful nature. He briefly gives up on his feelings after concluding she is not ready for love, but is unable to let them go.

Class 2-4, Chizuru is a girl who thinks of herself as unfun and gloomy. When her classmate Takurō Sugawara helped her reach a bus station after a rain shower hit and attempted a confession, Chizuru thought that Takurō just wanted to make her feel better. Although she is unaware of his feelings, as well as her own, she is still grateful for what he did for her and they strike up a friendship. She later develops feelings for Sugawara and often stares at him longingly.

Class 2-4, Goda is a stoic, dense guy. He begins dating Kamine after she confesses to him, but isn't good with communicating his feelings to her and tends to create misunderstandings between them.

Class 2-4, Kamine is an emotional and kind-hearted girl. She confesses to Goda and begins dating him, but his dense nature makes it difficult for Kamine to move their relationship forward. She is shown to be friends with Takano.

Class 2-4, Chiaki is a goofy guy that likes to joke around with Kana, often playing the funny man in their comedy bits. He was unaware that he and Kana were dating for the past year until Kana pointed it out to him. After that, he tries to take their relationship more seriously, but comedic situations make it almost impossible for him to make any moves on Kana.

Class 2-4, Kana is a goofy girl who likes to play off Chiaki's jokes, often playing the straight man in their comedy bits. She believed that she and Chiaki were dating for the past year until she realized he thought her confession was a joke. She tries to push their relationship forward, but comedic situations disrupt those plans. She is good friends with Kazuko, as is among those who confide in her. 

Class 2-4, Ayane is a drama club member who got rejected by her crush and was comforted by Katori, much to her dismay. She appears to be friends with Sugawara.

Class 2-1, Chiyo is a girl who often sees Yamane on the bus and became interested in him. After he helped her from being molested, she became more bold and started frequently asking him out in the hopes of starting a relationship with him, but their mutually low self-confidence hampers this. She eventually succeeds in confessing at a comiket, and they become a couple. She is a cooking club member.

Class 2-7, Yamane is an otaku who has had a crush on Chiyo after the two rode the same bus together. After he helped Chiyo from almost being molested at a bus, Chiyo began frequently asking him out, but Yamane's low self-confidence stemming from his nerdy persona and "derpy" face hamper this. Chiyo eventually succeeds in confessing at a comiket, and they become a couple.

Class 2-7, Motoyama is Yamane's otaku friend, who displays a hatred for girls for not appreciating his and Yamane's looks, but comes to appreciate Chiyo for not falling under this. After learning about Yamane and Chiyo's mutual attraction, he tries to assist them with varying results.

Class 2-4, Kazuko is a girl who is frequently consulted for love advice but has never experienced it herself. This changed when she met Katori and fell in love with him.

Third year

Class 3-8, Akagi is the student council president who caught Ryōko smoking on school grounds red-handed and blackmailed her into becoming his girlfriend in order to keep his mouth shut. In reality, he had been interested in her for a long time and used the smoking incident as an excuse to get closer. Despite his stuffy, serious appearance, he is a Casanova when it comes to Ryōko.

Class 3-8, Ryōko is a girl who looks like a delinquent, who often distances herself from her classmates and smokes after school. Despite her appearance, Ryōko is actually an innocent tsundere and gets flustered when Akagi flirts with her.

Class 3-5, Katori is a flamboyant boy who appears whenever love advice is needed, though he is not attracted to anyone himself. He is the president of the drama club. Often calling himself a "Dating Master" while only giving those who need his advice hints about what to do. His actions have varying results, with people either blowing him off or becoming entranced by him.

Class 3-2, Satsuki is a pink-haired girl with twin buns and a hyperactive personality. Despite having no interest in astronomy, she joined the Astronomy Club because she had a crush on Hideki. After he graduated, Satsuki became the only member of the club.

Shibasaki is a member of the Tea Ceremony Club. In the manga, she joins the Light Music Club under the pseudonym, "Miss Wabisabi", despite all of her teammates knowing her identity. She has dark, short green hair and straight bangs, and she always wears a red headband. She started dating Ubukata after he confessed that she was the only one for him.

First year

Class 1-3, Hotaru is Jun's younger sister with a brother complex. She hates everyone who gets close to her brother, particularly Yuki Minagawa due to her also being attracted to Jun, while Yuki seems to have fun teasing her. After some time, she goes easy on Yuki.

Class 1-6, Yūki is a first-year student who was forced to join the astronomy club by Satsuki and ended up developing feelings for her. But after he learned that Satsuki already had a boyfriend he began dating Nanase.

Class 1-9, Kaoru is Yūki's childhood friend who is in love with him but has tsundere tendencies. She followed him and joined the astronomy club, where she eventually confessed to him, and they eventually started dating.

Others

Hideki was an astronomy club member along with Satsuki. He is a serious person who doesn't seem to take Satsuki's confessions as real and easily becomes annoyed with it. Before his graduation, it turns out that he likes Satsuki's confessions all along. He is now a college student at a rural town and is in long distance relationship with Satsuki.

Media

Manga
Wakabayashi originally started publishing the story online in 2012 without actually giving it a title; it became known simply as "Toshiya Wakabayashi's 4-koma comic collection". Afterward, it started serialization in Kodansha's Bessatsu Shōnen Magazine on August 9, 2014 and was published in the magazine until March 9, 2015. The manga was transferred to Weekly Shōnen Magazine starting on April 15, 2015. with entirely redrawn art. The series ended on July 11, 2018, and has been collected into 12 tankōbon volumes.

In North America, Kodansha USA has started digitally publishing an English version.

Volume list

Anime
A TV anime adaptation was announced in February 2017. Studio Gokumi produced the anime with Hiraku Kaneko directing, series scripts is written by Tatsuhiko Urahata, and Etsuko Sumimoto is the character designer adapting Wakabayashi's original designs. The anime aired from July 4 to September 19, 2017 on Tokyo MX, Sun TV, and BS11. NAS produced the anime. Inori Minase performed the opening theme titled  while Yui Ogura performed the ending theme titled "Dear". The anime episodes were released as DVDs bundled with the limited edition of manga volume 9, 10, and 11, each contains 4 episodes. Crunchyroll streamed the anime. Funimation has licensed the series in North America.

Episode list

Notes

References

External links
 
 

2017 anime television series debuts
Anime series based on manga
Crunchyroll anime
Funimation
Japanese webcomics
Kodansha manga
Romantic comedy anime and manga
Shōnen manga
Studio Gokumi
Yonkoma
Tokyo MX original programming